The Travelers Championship is a professional golf tournament on the PGA Tour in Cromwell, Connecticut, a suburb south of Hartford. Since 1984 the tournament has been held at TPC River Highlands. It is managed by The Greater Hartford Community Foundation.  In 2018 the Travelers Championship earned the Players Choice Award for the second consecutive year, which is voted on by PGA Tour members for its services, hospitality, attendance and quality of the course.

The 2016 tournament was played in August due to the Summer Olympics, but in 2017 the tournament returned to June.

History
The tournament was founded  in 1952 as the Insurance City Open; It was renamed the Greater Hartford Open in 1967, a title that was retained through 2003.  From 1973 through 1988, the GHO also bore the name of entertainer Sammy Davis Jr., who would often play in the pro-ams. Canon was a title sponsor from 1985 to 2002, and their employees would often take vacation time during tournament week to volunteer at the event. Buick was title sponsor from 2004 to 2006 and The Travelers Companies took over sponsorship in 2007.

For the tournament's first three decades, it was played at Wethersfield Country Club, about five miles (8 km) north. In 1984, after the PGA Tour bought and redesigned Edgewood Country Club, the event moved to the new TPC of Connecticut in Cromwell. In 1991, the course was substantially redesigned with a completely new front nine holes and renamed the TPC at River Highlands. This TPC property was the third PGA Tour owned/managed championship golf course in what would grow to a network of over 30 TPC Clubs (2010).

When Canon announced it would not renew its sponsorship after the 2002 season, organizers feared the tournament would lose its spot on the tour for the 2003 season if a new sponsor could not be found. A fundraising campaign, followed by Buick signing a three year sponsorship agreement, allowed the tournament to continue under the title Buick Championship. When Buick did not renew its sponsorship after the 2006 season, the tournament briefly lost its spot on the tour schedule, and a "less prestigious" spot on the Champions Tour was considered. However, a spot opened on the tour, and Travelers signed on to sponsor the tournament starting 2007.

The purse for the 2006 tournament, under Buick's sponsorship, was $4.4 million, with $792,000 going to the winner. From 2007 to 2010, the purse under Travelers' sponsorship was $6 million, with $1,080,000 going to the champion.

Over the last decade, longer hitters have done well at the tournament, with Stewart Cink, Hunter Mahan, J. J. Henry, Phil Mickelson, and Bubba Watson combining for six victories over a ten-year span. Mahan also finished tied for second in 2006 and 2008.

Its position on the calendar has varied; in 2005 it was played in late August but in 2006 it was played in late June. Part of the FedEx Cup, the Travelers Championship has been played in late June, the week after the U.S. Open, since 2007.

For the 2020 season, it is part of the Open Qualifying Series providing up to two spots in the Open Championship for the top two non-exempt finishers in the top 8.

Attendance
It is the second-most-attended PGA Tour event annually, behind only the Waste Management Phoenix Open. In 2011, the tournament attracted 240,000 fans for the week and 70,000 fans on Sunday. The tournament set a record attendance in 2002 with nearly 400,000 fans for the week. In 2017 about 290,000 fans attended, the most since Travelers started hosting the tournament.

Course

Source:

Winners

Note: Green highlight indicates scoring records.
Sources:

Multiple winners
Seven men have won the Travelers Championship more than once through 2018.

4 wins
Billy Casper: 1963, 1965, 1968, 1973
3 wins
Bubba Watson: 2010, 2015, 2018 
2 wins
Arnold Palmer: 1956, 1960
Paul Azinger: 1987, 1989
Phil Mickelson: 2001, 2002
Peter Jacobsen: 1984, 2003
Stewart Cink: 1997, 2008

Highlights
 1952: Ted Kroll wins the inaugural tournament. He beats Lawson Little, Skee Riegel, and Earl Stewart by four shots.
 1955: Amateur Bill Whedon becomes the first player in PGA Tour history to record two holes-in-one in the same round.
 1956: Arnold Palmer makes the Insurance City Open his first United States based PGA Tour victory by beating Ted Kroll in a playoff. Afterwards Palmer said "Ted is a great guy—he even gave me the putter that beat him."
 1962: Bob Goalby defeats Art Wall Jr. on the seventh hole of a sudden death playoff after Wall misses an 18-inch putt for par on the 72nd hole.
 1967: African American golfer Charlie Sifford wins his first PGA Tour event. He beats Steve Oppermann by one shot.
 1968: Billy Casper becomes the tournament's first three-time winner. He beats Bruce Crampton by three shots.
 1972: Lee Trevino defeats Lee Elder in a sudden death playoff. If Elder had won, he would have become qualified for The Masters.
 1973: Billy Casper shoots a final round 64 to win for the fourth time at Hartford. He beats Bruce Devlin by one shot.
 1974: Dave Stockton wins by four shots over Raymond Floyd. After the tournament, Stockton gets a congratulatory call from then President Gerald Ford. Stockton also arranges to donate his entire $40,000 winnings check to charity.
 1977: Billy Kratzert beats Grier Jones and Larry Nelson by three shots. Two years earlier, Kratzert had quit golf and gone to work as a forklift operator.
 1981: Ninety-one players made the 36-hole cut, a PGA Tour record.
 1982: Tim Norris sets tournament records for aggregate (259) scoring and under par (−25) as he wins by six shots over Hubert Green and Raymond Floyd.
 1986: Mac O'Grady shoots a final round 62 to catch Roger Maltbie, then defeats him on the first hole of sudden death.
 1989: Paul Azinger chips it in on the 72nd hole to beat Wayne Levi by one shot.
 1992: Lanny Wadkins, who had last played in Hartford in 1978, shoots a final round 65 to win by two shots over Dan Forsman, Nick Price, and Donnie Hammond.
 2000: Notah Begay III wins for the second week in succession after he makes birdie on the 72nd hole to edge Mark Calcavecchia by one shot.
 2002: Phil Mickelson becomes the first winner to successfully defend his title. He beats Jonathan Kaye and Davis Love III by one shot.
 2003: Nineteen years after his first triumph in Hartford, Peter Jacobsen wins again, beating Chris Riley. Jacobsen's $720,000 winner's check was ten times what he earned in 1984. The tournament was also notable when Suzy Whaley became the first woman in 58 years to play in a PGA Tour event, though her appearance was controversial after playing from shorter tees during her qualifying tournament, the Connecticut PGA Championship.
 2011: Patrick Cantlay, an amateur golfer from UCLA, set a course-record of 10-under 60, the lowest round ever shot on the PGA Tour by an amateur.
 2014: Kevin Streelman birdies the last seven holes in the final round, a PGA Tour record for an event winner.
 2016: Jim Furyk shot a 12-under-par 58 in the final round, becoming the first player to shoot 58 in a PGA Tour event.
 2017: Jordan Spieth wins in a playoff against Daniel Berger by holing his bunker shot for birdie on the first playoff hole. Berger had a chance to advance the playoff, but missed his long birdie putt.
2021: Harris English wins a sudden-death playoff against Kramer Hickok on the 8th hole, a playoff which tied for the second longest sudden-death playoff in PGA Tour history.

References

External links

Coverage on the PGA Tour's official site
TPC River Highlands
Greater Hartford Jaycees website

PGA Tour events
Golf in Connecticut
Cromwell, Connecticut
Recurring sporting events established in 1952
1952 establishments in Connecticut
Sports competitions in Connecticut